Bereg was an administrative county (comitatus) of the Kingdom of Hungary. Its territory is now mostly in western Ukraine and a smaller part in northeastern Hungary. The capital of the county was Beregszász ("Berehove" in Ukrainian, Berehovo in Rusyn, Bergsaß in German, Beregovo in Russian, Bereg in Romanian).

Geography

Bereg county shared borders with the Austrian crownland Galicia (now in Poland and Ukraine) and the Hungarian counties Máramaros, Ugocsa, Szatmár, Szabolcs and Ung. It was situated between the Carpathian Mountains in the north and the river Tisza in the south. Its area was 3788 km² around 1910.

History
Bereg is one of the oldest counties in Hungary. In 1920 the Treaty of Trianon assigned most of the territory to Czechoslovakia. The southwestern part remained in Hungary and the county of Szatmár-Ugocsa-Bereg was created in 1923. 

Following the First Vienna Award Szatmár County was recreated, thus Bereg-Ugocsa county was created with Beregszász as capital. In 1939, after the breakup of Czechoslovakia the complete county was occupied and annexed by Hungary, however the redeemed territories of the former county remained separate as the administrative branch offices of Bereg.

After the Second Vienna Award, the county was recreated again.

After World War II, the most of the territory of Bereg county became part of the Soviet Union, Ukrainian SSR, Zakarpattia Oblast. The remainder was merged into the newly formed Szatmár-Bereg County. In 1950 it became part of Szabolcs-Szatmár County, which was renamed in 1990 to Szabolcs-Szatmár-Bereg.

Since 1991, when the Soviet Union split up, the Zakarpattya region is part of Ukraine.

Demographics

1900
In 1900, the county had a population of 208,589 people and was composed of the following linguistic communities:

Total:

 Ruthenian: 95,308 (45,7%)
 Hungarian: 93,198 (44,7%)
 German: 18,639 (8,9%)
 Slovak: 991 (0,5%)
 Romanian: 72 (0,0%)
 Croatian: 20 (0,0%)
 Serbian: 0 (0,0%)
 Other or unknown: 361 (0,2%)

According to the census of 1900, the county was composed of the following religious communities:

Total:

 Greek Catholic: 103,261 (49,5%)
 Calvinist: 56,289 (27,0%)
 Jewish: 29,052 (13,9%)
 Roman Catholic: 19,128 (9,2%)
 Lutheran: 780 (0,4%)
 Greek Orthodox: 44 (0,0%)
 Unitarian: 26 (0,0%)
 Other or unknown: 9 (0,0%)

1910
In 1910, the county had a population of 236,611 people and was composed of the following linguistic communities:

Total:

 Hungarian: 113,090 (47,8%)
 Ruthenian: 100,918 (42,6%)
 German: 20,722 (8,8%)
 Slovak: 1,123 (0,5%)
 Romanian: 215 (0,1%)
 Croatian: 54 (0,0%)
 Serbian: 12 (0,0%)
 Other or unknown: 477 (0,2%)

According to the census of 1910, the county was composed of the following religious communities:

Total:

 Greek Catholic: 117,435 (49,7%)
 Calvinist: 61,106 (25,9%)
 Jewish: 33,660 (14,2%)
 Roman Catholic: 23,003 (9,7%)
 Lutheran: 992 (0,4%)
 Greek Orthodox: 349 (0,0%)
 Unitarian: 13 (0,1%)
 Other or unknown: 53 (0,0%)

Subdivisions

In the early 20th century, the subdivisions of Bereg county were: 

All the towns mentioned are now in Ukraine.

Culture

Bereg cross stitch, an ancient traditional needlework

References

States and territories established in 1940
States and territories disestablished in 1920
States and territories disestablished in 1923
States and territories disestablished in 1945
1945 disestablishments in Hungary
Counties in the Kingdom of Hungary